Alternative therapies for developmental and learning disabilities include a range of practices used in the treatment of dyslexia, ADHD, autism spectrum disorders, Down syndrome and other developmental and learning disabilities. Treatments include changes in diet, dietary supplements, biofeedback, chelation therapy, homeopathy, massage and yoga. These therapies generally rely on theories that have little scientific basis, lacking well-controlled, large, randomized trials to demonstrate safety and efficacy; small trials that have reported beneficial effects can be generally explained by the ordinary waxing and waning of the underlying conditions.

Treatment needs
There are a number of non-standard treatments for developmental and learning disabilities. There is a call for alternative therapies particularly when a condition lacks a reliable remediation. For example, there is no cure for autism; the main goals of mainstream behavioral and medical management are to lessen associated deficits and family distress, and to increase quality of life and functional independence. Some alternative therapies, such as gluten-free, casein-free diets, may be appealing to some parents because the treatment recommended by most experts is thought to be "cold and manipulative". Parents may also consider a drug treatment for attention deficit as avoidable. Alternative treatments to a stimulant medication range from natural products to psychotherapeutic techniques and highly technological interventions. It has been argued that although texts that promote alternative therapies do not directly accuse parents of inadequacy, the claims that the disability is caused by certain factors, such as poor nutrition, supports the culture of mother-blame.

Prevalence 
From 12% to 64% of families of a child with ADHD use an alternative therapy, with the lower estimates likely come from narrower definitions of complementary and alternative medicine (CAM). School teachers, family and friends are the most common source of suggestion of alternative therapies for ADHD. In 2003, 64 percent of families of a child with special health care needs reported that they use alternative therapies. These therapies included spiritual healing, massage, chiropractic, herbs and special diets, homeopathy, self hypnosis and other methods of complementary and alternative medicine. The need for an alternative therapy was related to the child's condition and to its evaluation as repairable or not. A 2008 study found that about 40% of Hong Kong children with autism spectrum disorder were treated with CAM, with the most popular therapies being acupuncture, sensory integration therapy, and Chinese herbology; the 40% is a lower prevalence than in Canada and the U.S., where biological-based therapies such as special diets predominate. In the U.S. CAM is used by an estimated 20–40% of healthy children, 30–70% of children with special health care needs, and 52–95% of children with autism, and a 2009 survey of U.S. primary care physicians found that more of them recommended than discouraged multivitamins, essential fatty acids, melatonin, and probiotics as CAM treatments for autism.

Evidence basis
Complementary and alternative medicine often lacks support in scientific evidence, so its safety and efficacy are often questionable.

While some experts encourage parents to be open-minded, others argue that treatments and services with no proven efficacy have opportunity costs because they displace the opportunity to participate in efficient treatments and services. According to Scott O. Lilienfeld, many individuals who spend large amounts of time and money on ineffective treatments may be left with precious little of either. As a result, they may forfeit the opportunity to obtain treatments that could be more helpful. Thus, even ineffective treatments that are by themselves innocuous can indirectly produce negative consequences.

There is often little or no scientific evidence for effectiveness of alternative therapies. It may be difficult to separate the success of a specific treatment from natural development or from the benefits of the individual's positive attitude. Some phenomena that can explain positive results are the placebo effect, the Hawthorne effect and different types of attentional and motivational effects. People with disabilities may benefit from some alternative therapies, at least for relaxation, social interaction, personal development and self-esteem.

Precautions
Because many alternative therapies have not been evaluated in scientific studies there may be no guarantee for their safety. In most countries, with the exception of osteopathy and chiropractic, complementary medical disciplines have not been state registered. This means there is no law to forbid anyone from setting up as a practitioner even with no qualification nor experience.

See also

References

External links
Scientific Review of Alternative Medicine (SRAM)
CSL Dyslexia information online packet
British Dyslexia Association: Alternative therapies
Dyslexia Association of Ireland: Alternative therapies

 
Special education
Management of dyslexia